Gail Ellen Skroback Hennessey (born June 28, 1951) taught Social studies at Harpursville Central School in New York State. She writes children’s books and is the author of eight publications for teachers and students. In 1988, she was named Outstanding Elementary Social Studies Classroom Teacher of the Year by the New York State Council for social studies and also named Outstanding Elementary Social Studies Teacher of the Year by the National Council for Social Studies.

Her books for teachers and young people include:
 Famous Crafty People(DOK) out of print
 Discovering Economics, Consumer Ed. for Kids (DOK) out of print
 Will the Real Notable Women Please Stand Up? (Cottonwood Press) out of print
 Will the Real Notable American Authors Please Stand Up? (Cottonwood Press) out of print
 Will the Real Paul Revere Please Stand Up? (and 14 other American History Plays) (Scholastic Professional Books) out of print
 Readers Theater Scripts (Teacher Created Materials) (CURRENT)
 Will the Real Abraham Lincoln, Rosa Parks, Susan B. Anthony, Christopher Columbus and Benjamin Franklin Please Stand Up?(out of print)

 To Tell the Truth Plays(by Social Studies School Service's Interact)  (CURRENT) 

Gail's articles have appeared in the following publications:

 Scholastic News
 Scholastic's Super Science
 Scholastic's Science World
 Time for Kids
 Ranger Rick
 AppleSeeds
 Cobblestone
 FACES
 Ask Magazine
 Muse Magazine
 Highlights for Children
 National Geographic Kids
 Boys' Life
 Girls' Life
 Child's Life
 US Kids
 Jack and Jill Magazine
 Action Magazine

Gail wrote monthly teaching guides for Cobblestone's Ladybug, Click and Spider Magazines for many years and has had some articles in Instructor Magazine.

Currently, Gail writes for Aadarsh Publishing and has written over 30 books for their Purple Turtle series. After the success of the Purple Turtle books, an animated series of Purple Turtle has also created 52 episodes of 7 minutes each. The series was produced by Manish Rajoria and Ankita Shrivastava and co-produced with Telegael, Ireland and Cyber Group Studios, France. The creative director of the show is Swati Rajoria.

Gail has written some picture books for Colour Fairies. 

Gail's latest book of biographical plays on famous people in ancient history, Interviews with Ancient History, was published by Social Studies School Service, in 2016.

Gail has written two books for Red Chair Press' Series, Old History.(2020) Mrs. Paddington and the Silver Mousetraps and Fashion Rules.

References

External links

 Gail Hennessey's official web page

1951 births
American educators
American women writers
Living people
21st-century American women